is a city located in Kagawa Prefecture, Japan.

Geography
Sakaide is located in north-center Kagawa Prefecture, on the island of Shikoku, facing the Seto Inland Sea to the north. The northern part of the city  is flat and low elevation, with parts on reclaimed land. The city includes part of the Shiwaku Islands, including a number of islands which are connected by the Great Seto Bridge.  The southern part of the city is hill, and as with many other cities and towns in Kagawa Prefecture, there are many reservoirs. Fuchu Dam constructed on the main stream of the Ayagawa River, creates Lake Fuchu. Mount Iino, nicknamed Sanuki Fuji located on the border between Marugame and Sakaide and is one of the "Sanuki Seven Fujis". The Great Seto Bridge connects the city with Kurashiki, Okayama Prefecture across the Seto Inland Sea.

Neighbouring municipalities 
Kagawa Prefecture
Takamatsu
Marugame
Utazu
Ayagawa

Climate
Sakaide has a Humid subtropical climate (Köppen Cfa) characterized by warm summers and cool winters with light snowfall.  The average annual temperature in Sakaide is 15.6 °C. The average annual rainfall is 1439 mm with September as the wettest month. The temperatures are highest on average in January, at around 26.5 °C, and lowest in January, at around 5.4 °C.

Demographics
Per Japanese census data, the population of Sakaide has been declining steadily since the 1980s.

History 
The area of Sakaide was part of ancient Sanuki Province and has been inhabited since ancient times, with many kofun burial mounds found within the city limits. During the Asuka period the fortresss of Kiyama was constructed to guard against the possibility of invasion from Tang dynasty China. During the Edo Period, the area was part of the holdings of Takamatsu Domain, and once flourished as a center for salt production.  Following the Meiji restoration, the town of Sakaide was established with the creation of the modern municipalities system on February 15, 1890. It was elevated to city status on July 1, 1942.

Government
Sakaide has a mayor-council form of government with a directly elected mayor and a unicameral city council of 20 members. Sakaide, together with Utazu,  contributes three members to the Kagawa Prefectural Assembly. In terms of national politics, the city is part of Kagawa 2nd district of the lower house of the Diet of Japan.

Economy
Sakaide is an industry city, with shipbuilding and chemical industries, refineries and power stations located in the Bannoshu Rinkai Industrial Park, Hayashida-Agawahama Rinkai Industrial Park and other areas along the coast. Due to its position at the Shikoku end of the Great Seto Bridge, many  logistics companies are concentrated are also concentrated in these areas.

Education
Sakaide has 12 public elementary schools and five public middle schools operated by the city government, and one each by the national government. The city has three public high schools operated by the Kagawa Prefectural Board of Education, and the prefecture also operates one special education school for the handicapped.

Transportation

Railways 
 JR Shikoku - Yosan Line / Seto-Ōhashi Line - Marine Liner
  -  -  -

Highways 
  Seto-Chūō Expressway
  Takamatsu Expressway

Sister city relations
 - Sausalito, California, USA since February 2, 1988 
 - Lansing, Michigan, USA, friendship city since April 12, 1996

Local attractions
Kagawa Prefectural Higashiyama Kaii Setouchi Art Museum , (Kaii Higashiyama`s Art Museum)
Kandani Shrine
Mount Iino (Kagawa's Mount Fuji)
Kiyama (A castle ruin of Yamato court)
 Shōtsu-ji Castle (A castle ruin, Ikoma Chikamasa and Sengoku Hidehisa were commander of the castle)
 Tomb of Emperor Sutoku
 Tennō-ji, 79th temple on the Shikoku Pilgrimage.)
 Shiromine-ji, 81st temple on the Shikoku Pilgrimage
Fuchu Dam (Lake Fuchu)
Great Seto Bridge

Gallery

Festivals
Sakaide Tengu Festival 
Sakaide Salt Festival (May)
Sakaide Ohashi Festival (August)

Noted people from Sakaide
Juichi Tsushima, former Head of the Japan Olympic Committee

References

External links 

  

Cities in Kagawa Prefecture
Port settlements in Japan
Populated coastal places in Japan